The Librarians may refer to:

 The Librarians (2007 TV series), Australian TV comedy series
 The Librarians (2014 TV series), American TV fantasy series
 The Librarians (band), American power pop band
 The Librarians (film), 2003 action thriller

See also 
 The Librarian (disambiguation)